I Can't Believe It may refer to:

"I Can't Believe It", a song by The Animals, B-side to We Gotta Get out of This Place, 1965
"I Can't Believe It", a song by Ateed
"I Can't Believe It!", a song by Keith Green from For Him Who Has Ears to Hear, 1977
"I Can't Believe It", a song by Longbranch Pennywhistle used in the 1971 film Vanishing Point
"I Can't Believe It", a song by Melba Moore from Read My Lips, 1985
"I Can't Believe It", a song by Snowy White from That Certain Thing, 1987

See also
Can't Believe It (disambiguation)